Writers who have contributed to New Zealand literature include:

A

B

C

D

E

F

G

H

I

J

K

L

M

N

O

P

Q

R

S

T

U

V

W

Y

See also
New Zealand literature
List of New Zealand poets
List of New Zealand women writers

Notes

 
Writers
New Zealand